Aulonemia longiaristata is a species of bamboo in the family Poaceae. It is found only in Ecuador.

References

longiaristata
Endemic flora of Ecuador
Near threatened plants
Taxonomy articles created by Polbot